The Sony Pictures Studios is an American television and film studio complex located in Culver City, California at 10202 West Washington Boulevard and bounded by Culver Boulevard (south), Washington Boulevard (north), Overland Avenue (west) and Madison Avenue (east). Founded in 1912, the facility is currently owned by Sony Pictures and houses the division's film studios, such as Columbia Pictures, TriStar Pictures, and Screen Gems. The complex was the original studios of Metro-Goldwyn-Mayer from 1924 to 1986 and Lorimar-Telepictures from 1986 to 1989.

In addition to films shot at the facility, several television shows have been broadcast live or taped there. The lot, which is open to the public for daily studio tours, currently houses a total of sixteen separate sound stages.

History

Early years (1912–1924) 

Director Thomas H. Ince built his pioneering Inceville studios in Pacific Palisades, Los Angeles in 1912. While Ince was filming at Ballona Creek in 1915, Harry Culver, the founding father of Culver City, persuaded Ince to move Inceville  to Culver City. During that time, Ince co-founded Triangle Film Corporation and the Triangle Studios was opened in the form of a Greek colonnade – the entrance to the studios. The colonnade still stands fronting Washington Boulevard and is a Culver City historical landmark.

Ince added a few stages and an Administration Building before selling out to his partners D. W. Griffith and Mack Sennett. Ince relocated down the street and built the Culver Studios at that location. In 1918, Triangle Studios was sold to film producer Samuel Goldwyn. Goldwyn also added a few sound stages before selling his shares in Goldwyn Studios.

The Historic MGM Studios/Lorimar-Telepictures Studios/Lorimar Studios (1924–1990)

In 1924, Loew's President Marcus Loew organized the mergers and acquisitions of three film companies – The Metro Pictures, Goldwyn Pictures and Louis B. Mayer Pictures to form Metro-Goldwyn-Mayer and occupying the Goldwyn production facilities. 

In the Classic Hollywood cinema, MGM Studios was responsible for shooting 52 films a year, from screen epic films such as Ben-Hur, and Mutiny on the Bounty, to drawing-room dramas such as Grand Hotel, Dinner at Eight, and Anna Karenina. But it was the Technicolor musical films, including The Wizard of Oz, Singin' in the Rain and Gigi that MGM was best known for. MGM's success led to six working studio complexes, more than  including twenty-eight soundstages – Stage 15 is the second largest sound stage in the world, and Stage 27 served as "Munchkinland" in the production of The Wizard of Oz.

In addition to the main production building, MGM added two large backlot facilities – Lot 2 located opposite the main studio across Overland Avenue. Lot 3 entered the corner of Jefferson Boulevard and Overland Avenue and was MGM's largest backlot. The administration building was inaugurated in 1938 and was named for Thalberg.

However, the United States v. Paramount Pictures, Inc. antitrust case of 1948 severed MGM's connection with Loews Theaters, and it struggled through its affairs. 

On August 10, 1965, a massive fire destroyed Vault #7 in Lot 3, resulting in the loss of hundreds of silent-era films, among them Lon Chaney's 1927 film London After Midnight, though the majority of MGM's silent film stock survived the fire. In 1969, millionaire Kirk Kerkorian bought MGM and proceeded to dismantle the studio. Lot 3 was razed while Lot 2 was sold to housing developments. Kerkorian used the money to construct his MGM Resorts hotel chain.

In 1981, Kerkorian's Tracinda acquired United Artists and merged it with Metro-Goldwyn-Mayer to become MGM/UA Entertainment Co. He then sold MUEC to Ted Turner in 1986, who after 74 days, sold MGM/UA back to Kerkorian while retaining the pre-1986 MGM film library. In 1986, the studio lot was sold to Lorimar-Telepictures. During that time, the MGM logo was removed from the studios and moved across the street to the Filmland Building (now known as Sony Pictures Plaza) before their 1992 and 2003 moves to Santa Monica and Century City and finally settling in Beverly Hills from 2011 onwards.

Columbia Studios/Sony Pictures Studios (1990–present) 

In 1988, Warner Communications acquired Lorimar-Telepictures one year before merging with Time Inc. to become Time Warner. Later in 1989, Sony hired producers Jon Peters and Peter Guber to run the company's newly acquired Columbia Pictures Entertainment unit, even though they had a contract with Warner Bros. To resolve this issue, Warner sold their Lorimar lot to Columbia, among other deals. Columbia Pictures had been sharing with Warner Bros. their studio lot in Burbank, California in a partnership called The Burbank Studios beginning in 1972. Sony sold its interest in The Burbank Studios as a result of the Guber-Peters issue.

Sony acquired the property, first renamed Columbia Studios, in poor condition and thereafter invested $100 million to renovate the studio complex. The property underwent a three-year comprehensive plan as it transitioned to the  Sony Pictures Studios complex. The buildings, many of which still bore the names of MGM film actors such as Clark Gable, Judy Garland, Rita Hayworth and Burt Lancaster, were painted and upgraded. New walls were erected around the lot and the ironwork gates were restored. Nostalgic art deco and false fronts on Main Street were added, as well as hand-painted murals of Columbia film posters. The MGM logo was removed from the Filmland Building in late 1992.

The studio continues to record TV shows such as The Goldbergs, Ray Donovan, and Shark Tank. The long-running game shows Jeopardy! and Wheel of Fortune (studio 11) and its spin-offs, with Jeopardy!''' (The Alex Trebek Stage, formerly studio 10;  the studio was renamed in August 2021 prior to the start of the 38th season), are also taped at Sony Pictures Studios. The revival of American Gladiators produced by MGM Television was also filmed there.

 Taped programs 

 Talk shows 

 Donny & Marie (1998–2000)
 The Queen Latifah Show (2013–2015)
 Chelsea (2016–2017)

 Game shows 

 Wheel of Fortune (1995–present, Studio 11)
 Jeopardy! (1994–present, The Alex Trebek Stage; formerly Studio 10)
 Wheel 2000 (1997–1998, Studio 11)
 Jep! (1998–1999, Studio 11)
 Rock & Roll Jeopardy! (1998–2001, Studio 11)
 Hollywood Showdown (2000–2001, Studio 11)
 Pyramid (2002–2004)
 American Gladiators (2008 revival, Season 1 only)
 Are You Smarter than a 5th Grader? (2010–2011)
 Sports Jeopardy! (2014–2016, The Alex Trebek Stage; formerly Studio 10)
 Snoop Dogg Presents The Joker's Wild (2017–2019)
 Who Wants to Be a Millionaire (2020–2021)
 The Celebrity Dating Game (2021)

 Sitcoms 

 The King of Queens (1998–2007)
 Living with Fran (2005–2006)
 Married... with Children (1994–1997)
 That's My Bush! (2001)
 Cavemen (2007)
 Rules of Engagement (2007–2013)
 'Til Death (2006–2010)
 The Goldbergs (2013–present)
 Dr. Ken (2015–2017)
 One Day at a Time (2017–2020)
 Live in Front of a Studio Audience (2019, 2021)

 Dramas 

 Close to Home (2005–2007)
 The Guardian (2001–2004)
 Joan of Arcadia (2003–2005)
 Las Vegas (2003–2008)
 Party of Five (1994–2000)
 Masters of Sex (2013–2016)
 Ray Donovan (2013–2020)
 Insecure (2016–2021)

 Reality 
 Shark Tank (2014–2020)
 The Gong Show'' (2017–2018)

References

External links 

 Sony Pictures Studios
 Studio Lot History
 SPE Post Production

Studios
American film studios
Mass media companies established in 1912
Television studios in the United States
Companies based in Culver City, California
1912 establishments in California
Buildings and structures in Culver City, California